煎餅 may refer to:

 Jianbing, a type of Chinese egg flat bread
 Senbei, a type of Japanese rice cracker

See also
 煎 
 
 餅 (disambiguation)
 
 饼
 
 

Disambiguation pages with Chinese character titles